Luís Pinto or Luis Pinto may refer to:

 Luís Pinto (footballer), Portuguese footballer
 Luis Sousa Pinto, Portuguese volleyball player